Waldemar Folbrycht (born 19 April 1942) is a Polish footballer. He played in one match for the Poland national football team in 1968.

References

External links
 

1942 births
Living people
Polish footballers
Poland international footballers
Footballers from Poznań
Association football defenders
Pogoń Szczecin players
Zawisza Bydgoszcz players